Sha'ab is a neighborhood of Adhamiyah district, Baghdad, Iraq, It is subdivided into Sha'ab east (22nd), Sha'ab south (23rd), Sha'ab north (24th). The neighborhood is almost entirely Shia Muslim especially after the Shia militias takeover of the town in 2006 led by Mahdi Army known as the JAM which committed mass murders against Sunni families in order to create a Shia zone region in Baghdad .

References

 United Nations, humanitarianinfo.org: map listing 89 neighborhoods

Neighborhoods in Baghdad